María Arceo (born 19 December 1965) is a Cuban softball player. She competed in the women's tournament at the 2000 Summer Olympics.

References

External links

1965 births
Living people
Cuban softball players
Olympic softball players of Cuba
Softball players at the 2000 Summer Olympics
Place of birth missing (living people)